Albin Köbis (18 December 1892 – 5 September 1917) was a German sailor executed in 1917 for incitement to rebellion in the Imperial German Navy.

Life
Köbis was born in Reinickendorf which was incorporated into Berlin in 1920. He worked as a mechanic and as a sailor on merchant ships until he enlisted as a volunteer in 1912. In the Imperial German Navy he served as a stoker on the battleship Prinzregent Luitpold. In the summer of 1917, he became one of the leaders of a movement among sailors in the imperial fleet, whose complaints about food and other conditions soon developed into agitation against the war. 
He was arrested and condemned to death for incitement to rebellion on 26 August 1917 as a main ringleader along with Max Reichpietsch and three other sailors. The sentences on the other three were commuted to penal servitude, but Köbis and Reichpietsch were executed by firing squad on 5 September 1917.

These executions were denounced as naval judicial murders by Marxist politicians and newspapers, and helped trigger the Naval Mutinies of 1918, which led to the German Revolution of 1918–1919.  This has made Köbis and Reichpietsch heroes of the German socialist movement.

Commemoration
After World War II the name of a street in  Berlin-Tiergarten was renamed Köbisstrasse.

A television play about the case, Marinemeuterei 1917, was shown on West German television in 1969, directed by Hermann Kugelstadt and starring Dieter Wilken as Köbis and Karl-Heinz von Hassel as Reichpietsch.

See also 
 Kiel mutiny

References

Further reading
 Herwig, Holger H. (1977). Das Elitecorps des Kaisers, Hamburg: Hans Christians Verlag
 Horn, D. ed. (1967), War, Mutiny and Revolution in the German Navy – The World War I Diary of Seaman Richard Stumpf, New Brunswick, New Jersey: Rutgers University Press 
Merkl, Tanja (2018). Köbis und Reichpietsch, renitente, enttäuschte Seeleute oder Rebellen für das Streben nach Frieden und Gerechtigkeit? 58. Historisch -Taktische Tagung der Marine 2018
 Offenstadt, Nicolas (2022). Die „Roten Matrosen“ von 1917. In: Emmanuel Droit und Nicolas Offenstadt (eds.), Das rote Erbe der Front. Der Erste Weltkrieg in der DDR. De Gruyter Oldenbourg 2022, pp. 117-164
 Regulski, Christoph (2014). Lieber für die Ideale erschossen werden als für die sogenannte Ehre fallen – Albin Köbis und Max Reichpietsch und die deutsche Matrosenbewegung 1917, Wiesbaden: Marix-Verlag  
Sewell, Sara Ann (2009). Mourning Comrades: Communist Funerary Rituals in Cologne during the Weimar Republic, German Studies Review 32 (3), 527–548
Wissenschaftliche Dienste des Deutschen Bundestags (2017). Rechtskraft von Urteilen der kaiserlichen Militärjustiz. Die Todesurteile gegen Reichpietsch und Köbis im Sommer 1917, Ausarbeitung WD 7-3000 -116/17

German sailors
Imperial German Navy personnel of World War I
1892 births
1917 deaths
Executed people from Berlin
People from the Province of Brandenburg
20th-century executions by Germany
People executed by Germany by firing squad

Executed military personnel
People executed by the German Empire
People executed for mutiny
German military personnel killed in World War I